Les Baer Custom Inc.  is an American manufacturer of semi-custom firearms including M1911-pattern pistols and AR-15 type rifles. Les Baer Custom was founded by the gunsmith Les Baer, Sr. in 1991 in Hillsdale, Illinois.

History
Les Baer Custom Inc. was previously located in Hillsdale, Illinois, but moved to LeClaire, Iowa when Illinois started implementing restrictive gun laws.

This company, along with Smith & Wesson is currently the only pistol manufacturer who has authorization to use and display Clint Smith's Thunder Ranch logo, and currently offers a line of pistols and rifles that use the name. When asked for the reason that Les Baer would be given the authorization to use the Thunder Ranch logo, Clint Smith cited the outstanding accuracy and reliability of Baer's guns.

All Les Baer pistols come with a guarantee of at least 3" accuracy at 50 yards, and many models are available at extra cost ($295.00) with a guarantee of 1.5" at the same distance. All rifles are guaranteed to shoot .5 MOA groups, except for the recently introduced Patrolman's Carbine, which is guaranteed to shoot sub-MOA.

Les Baer recommends using the following ammunition in their pistols: Federal Premium Hydra-Shok, Federal American Eagle "ball", and Remington Golden Saber. Les Baer advises against using Winchester "White Box", aluminum-cased ammo, or Russian ammo in their pistols.

Product lines
 M1911 pistols 
 Baer 1911 DCM-Legal National Match Hardball Pistol
 Baer 1911 Police Pistol Combat Distinguished Match (P.P.C.)
 Baer 1911 Police Pistol Combat Open Class (P.P.C.)
 Baer 1911 Premier II 5" Model
 Baer 1911 Premier II 6" Model
 Baer 1911 Premier II Super-Tac
 Baer 1911 Prowler III
 Baer 1911 Custom Carry
 Baer 1911 Custom Carry Commanche
 Baer Ultimate Recon Pistol, 5"
 Baer 1911 Ultimate Tactical Carry 5" Model
 Baer 1911 Ultimate Master 5 
 Baer 1911 Ultimate Master 5 with Compensator 
 Baer 1911 Thunder Ranch Special
 Baer 1911 Thunder Ranch Special Home Defense Pistol With M3 Tactical Illuminator
 Baer 1911 TR "Commanche" Special
 Baer 1911 Thunder Ranch Special Engraved Model
 Baer 1911 Swift Response Pistol (SRP)
 Baer 1911 Monolith
 Baer 1911 Monolith Heavyweight
 Baer 1911 Monolith Tactical Illuminator Model
 Baer 1911 Monolith Commanche
 Baer 1911 Monolith Commanche Heavyweight
 Baer 1911 Stinger Model
 Baer 1911 Kenai 10mm
 Baer 1911 Stinger Model Stainless Steel
 Baer 1911 Concept
 I
 II
 III
 IV
 V
 V 6" Model
 VI
 VII Comanche Model 
 VIII Stainless Comanche Model
 Baer/Busse Combat Package
 Busse Combat Pistol With Integral Picatinny Rail System And Tactical Light
 Busse Combat Pistol With Conventional Frame
 Limited Edition Les Baer Presentation Grade 1911
 Les Baer Custom 25th Anniversary Model 1911 Pistol Special Collectors' Model
 AR .223 rifles
 Les Baer Custom Ultimate AR Varmint Model
 .223 Remington (5.56×45mm NATO)
 6.5mm Grendel (6.5×39mm)
 Les Baer Custom Ultimate AR .223 Super Match Model
 Les Baer Custom Ultimate AR M4 Flattop Model
 .223 Remington (5.56×45mm NATO)
 6.5mm Grendel (6.5×39mm)
 Les Baer Custom Ultimate AR .223 M4 Flattop LE Model
 Les Baer Custom Ultimate AR .223 M4 Flattop LE Camo Model
 Les Baer Custom Ultimate AR .223 ISPC Action Model
 Les Baer Custom Thunder Ranch Rifle
 Les Baer Custom Ultimate CMP Competition Rifle
 Les Baer Custom Ultimate NRA Match Rifle
 Les Baer Custom Ultimate AR .223 AR .204 Ruger Super Varmint Model
 Les Baer Custom Ultimate AR .223 AR .204 Ruger Super Match Model
 1911-A1/AR-15 sets
 Thunder Ranch Matched Rifle & Pistol Sets With Matching Serial Numbers
 Bolt action rifles 
 Les Baer Custom Tactical Bolt Action Rifles
 .243 Winchester
 .260 Remington
 .308 Winchester
 6.5 X .284 Norma
 .300 Winchester Magnum (with Enforcer Muzzle Brake)
 .338 Lapua Magnum (with Enforcer Muzzle Brake)
 Les Baer Custom Tactical Varmint Classic Bolt Action Rifles
 .243 Winchester
 .260 Remington
 .308 Winchester
 .300 Winchester Magnum (with Enforcer Muzzle Brake)

Les Baer Custom makes M1911 parts, magazines, grips and presentation cases, and custom work and refinishing services.

See also
 List of modern armament manufacturers

References

External links
 Les Baer Official Web Site

Companies based in Iowa
Firearm manufacturers of the United States
Scott County, Iowa